María Concepción of the Nativity and the Perpetual Help of Mary (María Concepción de la Natividad y el Perpetuo Socorro de María) is the religious name of the Reverend Mother Foundress of The Order of Atonement of the Franciscan Minims of the Perpetual Help of Mary (mfPS) which she founded on June 24, 1942, in Zamora, Michoacan, Mexico.

Early life
Born María Concepción Zúñiga López, María Concepción states that when she was still a young girl, Jesus Christ instructed and dictated the Rule and Constitutions of the Order to her.

During and after María Concepción's First Holy Communion (which her mother helped her daughter to make in secret because her father was a 33rd degree Mason and all the Catholic churches and schools in Mexico at that time were closed, and most priests, bishops and Religious had to go into in hiding due to the violent slaughter of Catholics by government forces or "Federales" under the Calles government) the Real Presence of Jesus in the Eucharist spoke to little María Concepción and taught her the Faith and how to pray since she had received absolutely no religious education or catechesis at all during this time (1924-1928) of anti-Catholic, anti-Church religious persecution throughout Mexico by the atheist Mexican president Plutarco Elías Calles.

Living in a secular household during a time of violent religious persecution in Mexico, María Concepción Zúñiga López had never seen women living in a Religious community and did not even know Religious Life for women existed. At one point in her education, she was learning secretarial skills that include typing and short hand from a group of women who taught in a business school near her home. María Concepción told her spiritual director, a famous Mexican bishop in hiding, that she was drawn to a life of prayer and the bishop explained to her that the women who were teaching her were Carmelites in hiding (they did not wear a Religious habit but secular dresses) and actually belonged to a Religious Congregation (Catholic), the Carmelite Sisters of the Sacred Heart (Hermanas Carmelitas del Sagrado Corazon) founded in María Concepción's home town of Jalisco by Venerable Mother María Luisa Josefa of the Most Blessed Sacrament.

Apostolic mission

Franciscan Minims of the Perpetual Help of Mary (mfPS) live the Primitive Rule of Saint Francis of Assisi and at their Profession make five Vows: Poverty, Chastity, Obedience, and two special Vows particular to the Order, the Vow of Victim to the Divine Justice and Mercy of Christ, and the Vow of Obedience to the Pope. The Superior General of the Order of Atonement of the Franciscan Minims of the Perpetual Help of Mary is the Pope, so Christ instructed the young María Concepción Zúñiga López regarding the focus of the work of the Franciscan Minims for the Holy See, which included living and preaching the Gospel in word, work and prayer to end schism within the Church and to catechize and convert schismatics, apostates, and those who had, in any way, separated themselves from the Church and the Vicar of Christ. Without exception, Mother María Concepción began all her writings and correspondence with the words: "Long Live the Vicar of Christ". Paul VI (1963-1978) was the incumbent Pope during the Second Foundation of the Order of Atonement in Mexico City.

María Concepción held that the work of the Apostolate of a Franciscan Minim Nun begins with their motto "Charity and Immolation" through Perpetual eucharistic adoration in union with the Eucharistic Victim Heart of Jesus in the Most Blessed Sacrament. She and the Minim Nuns associated with the Order of Atonement of the mfPS live a religious life that is both active and contemplative. They have a special focus on catechizing Catholic mothers and women living in the world through frequent religious conferences and retreats for women given by the nuns.

The Order which began as a "Pious Union" (the Code of Canon Law after 1983 uses the term Associations of the faithful) in Zamora, Michoacán, Mexico on June 24, 1942, and given status as a sodality on October 2, 1942, never ceased to exist canonically even though it was disbanded on October 23, 1951, by Bishop Jose G. Anaya. Canonical status was reaffirmed in Rome under Pope Paul VI on October 30, 1963, after Mother María Concepción travelled to Rome under the auspices of the same Bishop of Zamora who had earlier disbanded the first Foundation. With the express authorization of the Sacred Congregation of Religious, dated October 1963, the Order was founded a second time in Chilapa, Guerrero, Mexico in January 1964. Again, it received approval as a Pious Union in Mexico on September 1, 1964, after being placed under the protection of a Mexican Bishop, Fidel de Sta Maria Cortes Perez, whom the Pope introduced to Mother María Concepción while she was in Rome. Pope Paul VI assigned this Bishop to assist the foundress during a visit to Rome in October 1963 to ask Pope Paul VI for his help to re-establish the Order and to give it his full papal approval. Following the death of Pope Paul VI and of several bishops involved with promoting the Order, and the intervention of some Mexican prelates in Mexico and in the Vatican who opposed the Order's receiving direct Papal institution, approval and direction, the status of this request is still pending.

Fidel Sta Maria Cortes Perez, Bishop of Chilapa, wrote on September 1, 1964 (the Feast of Saint Anna the Prophetess, said to have been present when Mary and Joseph presented the Baby Jesus in the Temple 40 days after His Birth):

"Considering the good conduct, 
the noble goals that are proposed to atone to the Lord for the sins of men, 
of encouraging the spirit of prayer and of some other apostolates by the letter herewith,

WE APPROVE the Pious Union of the Franciscan Minims of the Perpetual Help of Mary, established in this city."

In 1963, just prior to the end of her exclaustration María Concepción Zúñiga López wrote in a brief autobiography of her life about the founding of the Order of Atonement, which she handed to Pope Paul VI during her first meeting with this Vicar of Christ:

Mother María Concepción died on October 15, the Feast of Saint Teresa of Avila, in 1979.

Historic delays and setbacks to the Order
While Mother María Concepción was still alive but after the death of the bishop of the Zamora foundation, the new bishop in the years following c. 1949–1952 along with some of the younger nuns wished to make changes to the Order that were not consistent with, and actually contradicted, what the foundress said Christ had told her. The foundress refused to compromise, and the Order was suppressed.
During the next 12 years of exclaustration Mother María Concepción documented that Jesus Christ made it clear to her that he had inspired others elsewhere worldwide regarding the formation of this Work of Atonement and Legion of Victim Souls. She later published and circulated to a subscription readership that extended worldwide that Christ had warned her that if Mexican prelates and others in Mexico continued to fail to establish "His" Order of Atonement, Christ would not be prevented meanwhile from, at the same time, inspiring others to do "His Will" elsewhere.Such developments remain Secular institutes (some in union with the Holy See but others not in union, that is, in either material or formal schism). They offer their own singular vision and interpretation of the Work of Atonement and those living within or exterior to these institutions freely exercise their own interpretation of the Work of Atonement ,  to grow in perfection and the Charity of Christ. Church approval can be delayed whenever interior locution or visions of Jesus and Mary are alleged. María Concepción was favored from the time of her First Holy Communion with these more unusual supernatural gifts. In 1932, at the age of 18, while still living a secular life in her family home in Jalisco and ten (10) years before the First Foundation of the Order in Zamora, María Concepción had a Vision, after which she illustrated and explained the Symbolic Image of the Divine Justice. The Church gave its approval for the propagation of this Symbolic Image of the Divine Justice and the explanation of the Vision with several imprimaturs including the most recent imprimatur of Fidel Sta Maria Cortes Perez, the Bishop of Chilapa, who was appointed by Pope Paul VI in 1963 to protect the Second Foundation of the Order along with its growth in Mexico City after the Founding Nuns moved from their temporary residence in the Roman Catholic Diocese of Chilpancingo-Chilapa to property donated for a permanent Monastery in the Federal District in the Tepeyac hills behind the Basilica of Our Lady of Guadalupe.

See also

References

External links
 Work of Atonement
 Dictionary : PIOUS UNION | Catholic Culture
 Atonement Booklets

Franciscan nuns
Mexican Roman Catholic religious sisters and nuns
1914 births
1979 deaths
People from Jalisco